Kolos is a rural locality (a settlement) in Rubtsovsky Selsoviet, Rubtsovsky District, Altai Krai, Russia. The population was 432 as of 2013. There are 6 streets.

Geography 
Kolos is located 12 km southwest of Rubtsovsk (the district's administrative centre) by road. Kolos (passing loop) is the nearest rural locality.

References 

Rural localities in Rubtsovsky District